Darya Vladimirovna Anenkova (born 2 April 1999 in Moscow, Russia) is a Russian Group rhythmic gymnast. She is the 2014 Youth Olympic Group all-around champion.

Junior 
Early in her career, Anenkova competed as an individual gymnast. She won the all-around silver medal behind compatriot Aleksandra Soldatova at the 2012 Gymnastik Schmiden International Tournament. In 2013, Anenkova began competing with the Russian Group.

In 2014, Anenkova competed with the Russian Group at the 2014 Moscow Grand Prix taking gold in Group all-around, following their placement, the Russian Group earned a qualification to compete for the Youth Olympic Games. On 26–27 August Anenkova, along with fellow group members (Daria Dubova, Victoria Ilina, Sofya Skomorokh, Natalia Safonova), competed at the 2014 Youth Olympic Games in Nanjing, China where they won gold in Group All-around finals.

References

External links 

 
 2014 YOG Profile
 Rhythmic Gymnastics Results
 

1999 births
Living people
Russian rhythmic gymnasts
Gymnasts from Moscow
Gymnasts at the 2014 Summer Youth Olympics
Youth Olympic gold medalists for Russia